Sir Harold Leslie White  (14 June 190531 August 1992) was the Parliamentary Librarian of Australia from 1947 to 1960, and National Librarian from 1960 until his retirement in 1970.

Career
White joined the staff of the Commonwealth Parliamentary Library when he was 18 years old in 1923 at 18. Four years later he became deputy librarian and went on to become Parliamentary Librarian in 1947, while simultaneously holding the title of National Librarian.

National Library
As Parliamentary Librarian and later National Librarian, he was known for his relentless advocacy of a separate home for the National Library of Australia, within the Parliamentary Triangle, Canberra.  When Sir Robert Menzies retired as Prime Minister in 1966, he remarked that he "jolly well had to give Harold White the National Library to shut him up".

Honours
White was appointed a Commander of the Order of the British Empire (CBE) in 1962, and knighted in the New Year's Honours of 1970.

In 1983 the Library Association of Australia gave him an H.C.L. Anderson Award (awarded for outstanding service to the library profession).

Family
White was born in Numurkah, Victoria and educated at Invergordon Primary School and Wesley College, Melbourne. 

He was the father of four children:

 David Ogilvie White, Professor of Microbiology at the University of Melbourne (1967–94)
 John White, formerly chief executive of the NSW Farmers' Association
 Judith Robinson-Valéry (1933-2010), foundation professor of French and the head of the school of western European languages at the University of NSW and later the director of research at the Centre National de Recherche Scientifique in Paris
 Katharine Ogilvie West, author and former visiting scholar in communication and public policy, University of Canberra.

Works 

 Canberra: A Nation’s Capital (1954)
 The Australian Capital Territory as a region (1955)
 Canberra: A Centre of Learning (1955)
 The Development of the Commonwealth Archives Programme (1957)

References

Further reading
 White, Harold, Sir (1968) The National Library in the Australian community, Sydney : Library Association of Australia  p. 286-292 : 1 ill. Offprint from the Australian library journal. (Oct. 1968) Speech delivered at the 22nd Annual Conference of CLA-ACB on 22 June 1967.
 Francis West (n.d.), "Harold Leslie White (1903-1992"), Australian Academy of the Humanities.
 "Sir Harold White", Australian Academic & Research Libraries (1993), Volume 24, Issue 3. A series of essays on White's life and work.

External links
 Harold White Fellowships

Australian librarians
Australian Knights Bachelor
Australian public servants
Australian Commanders of the Order of the British Empire
1905 births
1992 deaths
People from Canberra
Fellows of the Australian Academy of the Humanities
Directors-General of the National Library of Australia